No Regrets is the fourth full-length album by Swedish hard rock band Hardcore Superstar, released by the Music for Nations record label.

Track listing

References

External links
 Hardcore Superstar discography

2003 albums
Hardcore Superstar albums